Ullapool is a village and port located in Northern Scotland. Ullapool has a population of approximately 1,500 inhabitants. Despite its modest size, it is the largest settlement for many miles around. It is an important port and tourist destination. The North Atlantic Drift passes Ullapool, moderating the temperature. A few Cordyline australis (New Zealand cabbage trees) are grown in the town and are often mistaken for palm trees. The town lies on Loch Broom, on the A835 road from Inverness. The Ullapool River flows through the village.

History
On the east shore of Loch Broom, Ullapool was founded in 1788 as a herring port by the British Fisheries Society. It was designed by Thomas Telford. Prior to 1788 the town was only an insignificant hamlet made up of just over 20 households. The harbour is used as a fishing port, yachting haven, and ferry port. Ferries sail to Stornoway in the Outer Hebrides.

The village was historically in Cromartyshire, a county made up of many separate enclaves scattered across northern Ross-shire. Cromartyshire was abolished and combined with surrounding Ross-shire in 1890.

Many of the pivotal Victorian era discoveries that informed the concept of plate tectonics were made in this area. There are still regular international geological conferences held in Ullapool, which has been described as the top geological hotspot in Scotland.

Parliament granted permission in the 1890s for a railway from Ullapool to the main Highland network at Garve, but the scheme was abandoned due to insufficient funds.

The name is possibly derived from the Norse for "Wool farm" or "Ulli's farm".

Landscape
The region surrounding Ullapool is dominated by rugged mountains, and especially by Bheinn Ghobhlach to the west, An Teallach to the southwest (both across the loch), Beinn Dearg to the southeast close to the head of Loch Broom, and Beinn Mhòr na Còigich to the north. An Teallach is a mountain which dominates the area and consists of Torridonian sandstone, which is layered nearly horizontally. It is a challenging climb and a considerable distance from the nearest road. The climber will be rewarded with magnificent views of the surroundings, especially to the sea and the islands to the west, but also to the south, and the desolate Whitbread wilderness.

Culture

Ullapool has a strong reputation as a centre for music, the arts and performance.

The village has a small museum housed in a Telford Church, An Talla Solais, an arts centre with frequently changing exhibitions and workshops, a swimming pool and fitness centre, and several pubs, bed and breakfasts, restaurants and hotels. It is a centre for walkers, wildlife enthusiasts and other holiday-makers as it is situated in a scenic and remote part of Scotland.

In May every year there is the three-day Ullapool Book Festival which attracts a diverse range of writers and with work in both Scottish Gaelic and English. The Macphail Centre has a theatre hosting a regular programme of musical, dance and theatrical performances.  Many Scottish national companies participate, along with smaller reps and  the traveling Edinburgh Fringe performers. Due to the number of performances in any given week, there is overspill to the Village Hall and other venues.

The Tall Ships visited Ullapool in July 2011, a major event for the village and the surrounding area.

Ullapool is home to the shinty team Lochbroom Camanachd.

Music
Throughout the year there are many small fèisean and music festivals in the local halls and hotels, especially in the Ceilidh Place and the Arch Inn. The Ullapool Guitar Festival takes place in early October each year, attracting performers at several venues over the weekend. The Loopallu Festival, created by the American rock-grass band Hayseed Dixie and local promoter Robert Hicks in 2005, was well received and has become a major regional annual event, more than doubling the size of the village during the festival. In 2007 it attracted several bands including The Saw Doctors, Dreadzone and Franz Ferdinand headlining on the second night. There are also fringe events at local bars. The Pigeon Detectives have played the Village Hall. Amy MacDonald in 2008 and Paolo Nutini in 2007 both played the Ceilidh Place. Mumford & Sons have also played in Ullapool twice.

Ullapool has a local radio station called Lochbroom FM broadcasting on 102.2 and 96.8 FM and online, with programming provided mostly by Two Lochs Radio in Gairloch.

In popular culture
The community was rated as among the "20 most beautiful villages in the UK and Ireland" by Condé Nast Traveler in 2020.

Ullapool is referenced in the multiplayer video game Team Fortress 2 as the hometown of the Demoman and in the name of an in-game melee weapon that the Demoman can choose to have in his loadout, the "Ullapool Caber".

Ferry service
The ferry terminal is linked to the A835 trunk road with the A893. During 2022 the Ullapool Harbour Trust commenced a £4.3 million project to construct a new promenade and wider access road along the trunk road which will improve the inner harbour, provide pontoons for marine tourism and provide better access for pedestrians and cyclists. At the terminal Caledonian MacBrayne operates a roll-on/roll-off carferry to Stornoway on the Isle of Lewis.

Gallery

Climate
Ullapool has an oceanic climate (Cfb) with, considering its northerly latitude, relatively mild temperatures year-round. With an average 1,105 sunshine hours per year, it is cloudier than any major city in Europe.

See also
 Morefield
 Stac Fada Member, distinctive geology resulting from the largest bolide impact ever to strike what are now the British Isles

References

External links 

Ullapool Photo Slide Show 35 large images for Phones and up to 60 inch TVs
Ullapool Tourist and Business Association official site
 Ullapool Accommodation updated daily by the accommodation providers
 Ullapool tourism, community and business website
 Ullapool tourism guide
 Loopallu Festival website
 Biggest UK space impact found — BBC News

Populated places in Ross and Cromarty
Ports and harbours of Scotland
Port cities and towns in Scotland
Fishing communities in Scotland
Villages in Highland (council area)
Populated places established in 1788
1788 establishments in Scotland
Populated coastal places in Scotland